Walter J. McArthur (21 March 1912 – 10 September 1980) was a professional footballer who played in The Football League for Bristol Rovers as a wing half.

McArthur started his footballing career at his home town club Denaby United in 1930, and after a spell at Goldthorpe United he signed for Bristol Rovers in February 1933. He remained at Rovers for seventeen years, although this period was interrupted by the Second World War, and made 261 League appearances, scoring fourteen goals in the process.

On retiring from playing in 1950 McArthur became assistant trainer at Bristol Rovers, and he was appointed as their trainer in 1962. He lived in the Fishponds area of Bristol until his death in 1980.

Sources

1912 births
1980 deaths
People from Conisbrough
Footballers from Doncaster
English footballers
Association football midfielders
Denaby United F.C. players
Bristol Rovers F.C. players
English Football League players